The Great Seal of the Philippines (Filipino: Dakilang Sagisag ng Pilipinas) is used to authenticate official documents of the government of the Philippines. 

It may refer to the physical seal itself or the design impressed upon it. By law, the President of the Philippines is given the custody of the seal.

Design and usage
Republic Act No. 8491 specifies a Great Seal for the Republic of the Philippines:

Historical designs

Seals of the Philippine Revolutionary states
The First Philippine Republic featured a seal composed of an equilateral triangle with three stars representing Luzon, Visayas, and "Mindanao and Sulu" and an eight-rayed sun. There were several variations of the seal such as different arrangement of the stars and the presence or absence of a face on the sun. The Republic of Biak-na-Bato, and Malolos Republic also used seals.

American period
In 1903, a design by Melecio Figueroa, a Filipino engraver, for coinage was adopted for the design of the Great Seal under the United States-administered Insular Government. The seal featured Mayon Volcano and a Filipino woman in Filipiniana attire striking an anvil, surrounded by the text "United States of America, Government of the Philippine Islands". This seal has "never been legally adopted by the Philippine Commission" was supplanted by a design of John R.M. Taylor in 1905, when a new coat of arms was also adopted.

The seal was revised when the Philippine Commonwealth was established in 1935, and the new coat of arms was patterned after the Philippine flag. The seal was composed of the arms inscribed in a circle with the text "United States of America, Commonwealth of the Philippines". President Manuel L. Quezon adopted a new coat of arms and seal in through Executive Order No. 313 on December 23, 1940. The seal was not used despite its official adoption, and the Commonwealth reverted to the 1935 seal on February 23, 1941.

Second Philippine Republic
The  Second Philippine Republic of 1943 to 1945, a puppet state of Imperial Japan, adopted a different seal in October 1943. President Jose P. Laurel issued Republic Act No. 5, which states that the design is a triangular emblem encircled by a double marginal circle. The law dictates the seal to be:

Post–World War II
After the dissolution of the Philippine Commonwealth and the granting of the full independence of the Philippines by the United States in 1946, a new coat of arms was adopted along with a great seal. The seal was composed of the seal inscribed in a double marginal circle with the text "Republic of the Philippines". The seal had little revisions. In 1978, President Ferdinand Marcos, included the motto "Isang Bansa, Isang Diwa" (“One Nation, One Spirit”) and the inscription of the seal was in Filipino as "Republika ng Pilipinas, Opisyal na Tatak".

See also
 Seal of the President of the Philippines
 Seal of the Vice President of the Philippines
 Seal of the Philippine Senate

References

Great Seal
National seals